William Bobo Majors (November 7, 1938 – October 18, 1965) was a professional American football defensive back who played for the Buffalo Bills in 1961 in the American Football League.

External links
Pro-Football-Reference

1938 births
1965 deaths
Buffalo Bills players
American football defensive backs
People from Lynchburg, Tennessee
Tennessee Volunteers football players
Players of American football from Tennessee